The mesonephros is one of three excretory organs that develop in vertebrates. It serves as the main excretory organ of aquatic vertebrates and as a temporary kidney in reptiles, birds, and mammals. The mesonephros is included in the Wolffian body after Caspar Friedrich Wolff who described it in 1759. (The Wolffian body is composed of: mesonephros + paramesonephrotic blastema)

Structure
The mesonephros acts as a structure similar to the kidney that, in humans, functions between the sixth and tenth weeks of embryological life. Despite the similarity in structure, function, and terminology, however, the mesonephric nephrons do not form any part of the mature kidney or nephrons.

In humans, the mesonephros consists of units which are similar in structure and function to nephrons of the adult kidney. Each of these consists of a glomerulus, a tuft of capillaries which arises from lateral branches of dorsal aorta and drains into the inferior cardinal vein; a Bowman's capsule, a funnel like structure which surrounds the glomerulus; and a mesonephric tubule, a tube which connects the Bowman's capsule to the mesonephric duct. A unit consisting of a single glomerulus and the Bowman's capsule surrounding it is called renal corpuscle, and a unit consisting of single renal corpuscle with its associated mesonephric tubule is called a "nephron" or "excretory mesonephric unit".

Development

Mesonephric vesicle
Formation of each mesonephric nephron begins when a bit of the intermediate mesoderm adjacent to the mesonephric duct differentiates to form a mesonephric vesicle.

Mesonephric tubules

This vesicle then elongates to form the mesonephric tubule, attaching to the mesonephric duct on one side. Meanwhile, an artery from the dorsal aorta begins extending towards the mesonephric tubule. When these two structures contact each other, they form the glomerulus and the Bowman's capsule surrounding it. The mesonephric tubule is also known as the Wolffian tubules (or Kobelt's tubules).

On the medial side of the mesonephric duct, from the sixth cervical to the third lumbar segments, a series of tubules, the Wolffian tubules, develops. They increase in number by outgrowths from the original tubules. The change from solid masses of cells to instead become hollowed in the center. One end grows toward and finally opens into the mesonephric duct, the other dilates and is invaginated by a tuft of capillary bloodvessels to form a glomerulus.

Formation
The tubules collectively constitute the mesonephros.

Function
The mesonephros as a whole produces urine from the 6th through the 10th week of development. Despite the similarity in structure, function, and terminology, however, the mesonephric nephrons do not form any part of the mature kidney or nephrons. As the more caudal nephrons form, the more cranial nephrons are already degenerating. In females the mesonephros degenerates entirely, though vestigial structures such as Gartner's ducts, the epoophoron, and paroophoron are common. In males, a few of the more caudal tubules will survive and give rise to the efferent ductules of the testis, the epididymis, vas deferens, seminal vesicle, as well as vestigial structures such as the appendix testis, appendix epididymis, and paradidymis.

Other animals

The mesonephros persists and forms the anterior portion of the permanent kidneys in fish and amphibians, but in reptiles, birds, and mammals, it atrophies and for the most part disappears rapidly as the permanent kidney (metanephros) begins to develop during the sixth or seventh week. By the beginning of the fifth month of human development, only the ducts and a few of the tubules of the mesonephros remain.

Additional images

See also 
 pronephros
 metanephros
 paramesonephric ducts, ducts beside (para-) the mesonephros

References

Embryology of urogenital system
Kidney
Scrotum